Infinite Baffle is the fourth and final studio album by Spongehead, released on April 2, 1996, by Triple X Records.

Track listing

Personnel 
Adapted from the Infinite Baffle liner notes.
Spongehead
David Henderson – baritone saxophone, tenor saxophone, soprano saxophone
Doug Henderson – guitar, bass guitar, vocals, production
Mark Kirby – drums

Release history

References

External links 
 

1996 albums
Spongehead albums
Albums produced by Doug Henderson (musician)
Triple X Records albums